Arashpreet Singh is an Indian professional footballer who plays as a defender for  Mohammedan the I-League.

Career

Born in Punjab, Singh began his career with Minerva Punjab in the I-League 2nd Division. After the 2nd Division season, Singh had a trial with I-League side East Bengal. He stayed with Minerva Punjab and made his professional debut for the club on 8 January 2017 in their first I-League match in history against Chennai City. He started and played the full match as Minerva Punjab drew 0–0.
The centre-back extended his contract with Minerva Punjab and stayed with the club until 2019 before making a move to Real Kashmir FC. His notable season with Punjab was when the side won the 2019 I-League.During the previous season, Arashpreet made 6 appearances for Real Kashmir FC and was booked twice throughout the season.

References

External links 
 Minerva Punjab Profile.

Year of birth missing (living people)
Living people
People from Punjab, India
Indian footballers
RoundGlass Punjab FC players
Association football defenders
Footballers from Punjab, India
I-League 2nd Division players
I-League players
Real Kashmir FC players